Daniel Asher Alexander (6 May 1768 – 2 March 1846) was an English architect and engineer.

Life
Daniel Asher Alexander was born in Southwark, London and educated at St Paul's School, London. He was admitted to the Royal Academy Schools in 1782.

His first major work was the improvement of the medieval bridge at Rochester. The bridge was widened and the two central arches merged into one to provide a wider channel for shipping. The work was  not completed until 1824,  by which time Alexander had been dismissed from his post as engineer to the bridge.  He was the principal architect of Dartmoor Prison and Maidstone Prison, two of the oldest gaols still in use in the United Kingdom.

In 1799 he carried out a detailed survey of Rochester Cathedral, and recommended a programme of repairs, which was begun in 1801.

Alexander was  the surveyor to the London Dock Company between 1796 and 1831 and was responsible all the buildings at the London Docks during that time, including the Pennington Street Warehouses and the London Dock House. The dock basins themselves were by the company's engineers, including John Rennie.

In his capacity  as surveyor  to the Trinity House he built a number of lighthouses, including  the High Lighthouse at Harwich (1818), and others at Holyhead, Farne Island, and Lundy Island, the latter built on older foundations in 1819.  Other works include Mote House near Maidstone, built in the 1790s for the 1st Earl of Romney; Coley House near Reading and extensions to Inigo Jones' Queen's House (then the Royal Naval Asylum) in Greenwich, London.

In later life he lived at Yarmouth, Isle of Wight, and at Exeter, where he died.

His pupils included James Savage, John Whichcord Snr, William Hurst Ashpitel and Charles Busby.

Notes

1768 births
1846 deaths
19th-century English architects
English surveyors
Architects from London